Naim Kryeziu (4 January 1918 – 20 March 2010) was an Kosovo Albanian football player famous in Italy in the 1940s and 1950s.

Club career
Born in Gjakova, Republic of Kosovo, Kryeziu was a particularly quick right winger able to run 100 m in 11 seconds. He left his town in Kosovo as a youngster to join his brother in Tirana, making his footballing debut in the domestic top flight at the age of 15. Following the 1939 Italian invasion of Albania, he was noted by an Italian sports professor who suggested him to AS Roma. As he was considered an Italian following the annexation of Albania, he was allowed to enrol in the Rome ISEF (Italian sports university) whilst also playing for AS Roma, where he won an Italian title in 1941–42. He played for the giallorossi until 1948, when he joined A.C. Napoli; he finally retired in 1953.

Later career
He later started an coaching career, serving also as AS Roma head coach for a short time during the 1963–64 season as a replacement for Alfredo Foni. He then became a scout for AS Roma, for which he discovered a young Giuseppe Giannini when played in a local club Frattocchie Marino.

Kryeziu died in Rome at the age of 92 in 2010. He was the last living player of the first historical AS Roma scudetto. AS Roma, who was scheduled to play an evening game against Udinese on that day, played the game with black armbands to honour him.

References

External links
Profile at Enciclopediadelcalcio

1918 births
2010 deaths
Sportspeople from Gjakova
Association football wingers
Yugoslav footballers
KF Tirana players
A.S. Roma players
S.S.C. Napoli players
Serie A players
Serie B players

Yugoslav expatriate sportspeople in Italy
A.S. Roma managers
Expatriate football managers in Italy
Yugoslav expatriates in Albania